The second cabinet of Per Albin Hansson was the cabinet of Sweden from 1936 to 1939. It was a coalition cabinet consisting of the two parties: Social Democrats and the Farmers' League.

History

Before the election 
Since 1933, the Social Democrats had organized cooperation with the Farmers' League, when a historic compromise was reached between the parties regarding political collaboration, which was an important part of the Swedish model.
This cooperation ceased temporarily in the summer of 1936, when Per Albin Hansson resigned his first cabinet. The reason for the resignation was that it did not get the support in parliament for its defense policy, even though it was only three months left to the autumn general election.

The task of forming a new government went to the Farmers' League's leader Axel Pehrsson-Bramstorp. This so-called vacation government launched any reforms or implemented some changes in the law since the parliament was not collected. The fall elections were a major success for the Social Democrats, which gave rise to the Prime Minister to submit the government's resignation.

After the election 
The task of forming a new government went back to Per Albin Hansson as to the general astonishment government began negotiations with the Farmers' League, possibly because the Social Democrats did not want to depend on any of the left parties in parliamentary polls. The Farmers' League received three ministerial posts: Pehrsson-Bramstorp as minister for agriculture, Karl Gustaf Westman as minister for justice, and Janne Nilsson as minister for defence. Together, the two parties in the coalition a majority in both chambers, to sklinnad from previous minority governments. On 9 December 1938 Janne Nilsson died and was replaced by a social democratic politician, Per Edvin Sköld.

In the period leading to World War II, the Government implemented a number of social reforms, including expensive district grouping of basic pensions and the introduction of two weeks paid vacation for all workers.

When the Finnish Winter War broke out, the government resigned and instead formed a coalition government, consisted of the Social Democrats, the Farmers' League, the Liberal People's Party, and the National Organization of the Right.

Ministers

References 

Bibliography
 

Hansson, 2
Coalition governments
1936 establishments in Sweden
1939 disestablishments in Sweden
Cabinets established in 1936
Cabinets disestablished in 1939